Dunavac literally means "small Danube". It may refer to:

Dunavac, a suburban settlement of Belgrade
Dunavac (Ostrovo), a former arm of Danube around  Ostrovo peninsula
Dunavac is the name of several arms of Danube in Slavic languages